Goeppertia mediopicta (syn. Calathea mediopicta), the middle-stripe prayer plant, is a species of flowering plant in the family Marantaceae, native to Espírito Santo state in southeastern Brazil. It has gained the Royal Horticultural Society's Award of Garden Merit.

References

mediopicta
Endemic flora of Brazil
Flora of Espírito Santo
Plants described in 2012